Buzz about Bees is a 2013 non-fiction book for ages 7+ by Kari-Lynn Winters, published by Fitzhenry & Whiteside. An award-winning entry in the publisher's nature series, following Lowdown on Earthworms, it introduces children to concepts of endangered species, the unique role bees play in the ecosystem, and their relationship with humans.

Awards
 2015: Shortlisted: Alberta provincial readers'-choice Rocky Mountain Book Award
 2014: Shortlisted: Forest of Reading's "Silver Birch Express" award
 2014: Nominated: Canadian Science Writers' Association's "Outstanding Youth Book"
 2014: Selected: Ontario Library Association's "Best Bets"
 2013: Selected: Resource Links magazine's "Best Books of 2013"
 2013: Recommended, Canadian Toy Testing Council Toy Report 2014 "Best Books"
 2013: Selected: Canadian Children's Book Centre's "Best Books for Kids and Teens"

Contents
Imagine a world without bees. Not only would it be less colourful — with fewer wildflowers and flowering plants — it would be less fruitful as well. A world without bees would mean a world where the food supply would be significantly diminished. Global bee researcher Laurence Packer estimates that bees are responsible for 1/3 of our food supply.

Accompanying information about the history, social structure and science behind the world of bees and honey are conservation activities to make the world a place where hives of bees can thrive.

References

External links

Published reviews of Buzz About Bees
Publisher's webpage for Buzz about Bees

Children's non-fiction books
2013 children's books
Canadian children's books
Canadian picture books
Bees in popular culture
Canadian non-fiction books
Fitzhenry & Whiteside books